Sphaerocerinae is a subfamily of flies belonging to the family Sphaeroceridae.

Genera
 Afromyia Kim, 1968
 Ischiolepta Lioy, 1864
 Lotobia Lioy, 1864
 Mesosphaerocera Kim, 1972
 Neosphaerocera Kim, 1972
 Parasphaerocera Spuler, 1924
 Safaria Richards, 1950
 Sphaerocera Latreille, 1804
 Trichosphaerocera Papp, 1978

References

Sphaeroceridae
Brachycera subfamilies
Taxa named by Pierre-Justin-Marie Macquart